Hurricane Katia was a fairly intense Cape Verde hurricane that had substantial impact across Europe as a post-tropical cyclone. The eleventh named storm, second hurricane, and second major hurricane of the active 2011 Atlantic hurricane season, Katia originated as a tropical depression from a tropical wave over the eastern Atlantic on August 29. It intensified into a tropical storm the following day and further developed into a hurricane by September 1, although unfavorable atmospheric conditions hindered strengthening thereafter. As the storm began to recurve over the western Atlantic, a more hospitable regime allowed Katia to become a major hurricane by September 5 and peak as a Category 4 hurricane with winds of  that afternoon. Internal core processes, increased wind shear, an impinging cold front, and increasingly cool ocean temperatures all prompted the cyclone to weaken almost immediately after peak, and Katia ultimately transitioned into an extratropical cyclone on September 10.

Although Katia passed well north of the Lesser Antilles, a yellow alert was hoisted for Guadeloupe to notify residents of dangerous seas. Strong rip currents along the East Coast of the United States led to the deaths of two swimmers. After losing its tropical characteristics, Katia prompted the issuance of numerous warnings across Europe. Hurricane-force winds impacted numerous locations, downing trees, toppling power poles, and leaving thousands without electricity. The storm was responsible for two deaths in the United Kingdom: one when a tree fell on a vehicle in County Durham, and another during a multi-car accident on the M54 motorway resulting from adverse weather conditions. The post-tropical cyclone caused approximately £100m ($157 million, 2011 USD) in damage in the United Kingdom alone.

Meteorological history

On August 27, the National Hurricane Center (NHC) began monitoring a large mass of convection associated with a tropical wave just off the western coast of Africa. The depression initially struggled upon designation, with its well-defined center displaced near the northeastern edge of the storm's convection as a result of strong east-northeasterly wind shear. By 00:00 UTC on August 30, however, an increase in the cyclone's convective organization marked its intensification into Tropical Storm Katia.

Katia tracked west-northwestward for several days, steered by an expansive mid-level ridge to the cyclone's north. The strong upper-level winds that were affecting the cyclone gradually slackened, allowing for the expansion of a central dense overcast, the formation of a large curved band in the southern semicircle, and development of a banding eye on microwave imagery. Although conditions were forecast to remain conducive for further intensification, water vapor satellite and microwave imagery indicated that mid-level dry air began eroding eyewall convection immediately after the storm's upgrade, and upper-level winds eventually became less favorable as Katia approached a sharp upper-level trough. As a result, the storm maintained its status as a minimal hurricane for almost three days, with only a partial eyewall or banding-eye feature appearing on satellite.

Early on September 4, the hurricane moved beneath a large upper-level anticyclone which provided a reprieve from the strong southwesterly wind shear. Although its convective organization had yet to become fully symmetrical, an eye became increasingly apparent on infrared imagery. Although an eyewall replacement cycle briefly caused the storm's convective pattern to deteriorate, Katia attained major hurricane status—a Category 3 or higher on the Saffir–Simpson hurricane wind scale—by 12:00 UTC on September 5.

Almost immediately after attaining peak intensity, Katia began to rapidly weaken as a second eyewall replacement cycle began; it was quickly stunted as dry air wrapped into the western portion of the circulation and northwesterly wind shear increased. The inner core process was completed by early on September 7, allowing Katia to level off in intensity as a Category 1 hurricane for several days. Increasing southwesterly flow resultant from an upper-level trough pushing eastward across the United States caused Katia to slow in forward motion and recurve northeast or east-northeast through September 9. The hurricane re-accelerated late that day, eventually bringing Katia over ocean temperatures near . Increasing baroclinic energy fueled the powerful extratropical low, which skirted the northern coast of Scotland on September 12, before being absorbed by a larger extratropical system over the North Sea on the following day.

Preparations and impact

Lesser Antilles and United States

Although Katia passed well northeast of the Lesser Antilles, a yellow alert was hoisted in Guadeloupe for the potential of  swells. Antigua and Barbuda recorded  of rainfall between September 6 and September 7 from an outer band.

On September 4, the NHC noted that large swells likely to cause life-threatening rip current conditions were expected to impact the East Coast of the United States over subsequent days. The increased surf resulted in the death of a swimmer in Ormond Beach, Florida the following day, and a second death off Monhegan, Maine on September 11.

Europe

After transitioning into a post-tropical cyclone, Katia moved quickly across the North Atlantic and toward Europe, prompting the Met Office to begin warnings citizens for potential impacts over subsequent days on September 9. Three days later, the organization raised a yellow severe weather alert for all of Ireland and most of the United Kingdom, with a more severe amber alert hoisted across Northern Ireland, northern England, and southern Scotland; both alerts warned of the potential for gale-force winds. Concurrently, Met Éireann outlined an extreme weather warning across Ireland, alerting residents to the potential for  winds, downed trees, damaged buildings, and flooding. Irish ferries cancelled a number of its sails between Dublin and Holyhead. The Swedish Meteorological and Hydrological Institute warned of gale-force winds along the coastline of Sweden, although a brunt of the rainfall was expected in neighboring Norway.

Waves up to  battered the western coastline of Ireland, and fallen power lines temporarily disrupted DART services. Approximately 4,000 households were left without power across the country. A catering marquee was blown into the air on a set for the television series Game of Thrones, causing one injury. In County Durham, United Kingdom, a man was killed after a tree fell on the minivan he was driving; the passenger sustained non-life-threatening injuries. A second driver was indirectly killed on the M54 motorway after hazardous weather caused a multi-car accident. Farther south in Bradford, an 11-year-old boy was injured after he was hit by a portion of a roof blown off a garage. Downed power poles set several fields on fire. The second stage of the Tour of Britain was forcefully canceled after strong winds littered the cycle route with debris. The remnants of Katia produced damage as far east as Russia. In St. Petersburg, wind gusts up to  damaged buildings and left roughly 1,500 residents without power.

See also

Other tropical cyclones of the same name
Tropical cyclone effects in Europe
List of Category 4 Atlantic hurricanes
Hurricane Faith (1966)
Hurricane Charley (1986)

References

External links 

Katia (2011)
Katia (2011)
Katia (2011)
Katia (2011)
2011 disasters in the United Kingdom